Philip Henry Cecil Hilborne was Archdeacon of Antigua from 1945 to 1950.

Pilgrim was educated at Codrington College and  ordained in 1930. After a  curacy at St John's Cathedral, Antigua he held incumbencies in Barbados and Antigua.

Notes

20th-century Anglican priests
Archdeacons of Antigua
Alumni of Codrington College